Reactionary is the sixth studio album by the band Face to Face. Released in 2000, it was recorded in January 2000. The band ran a promotion with MP3.com where fans could decide which songs ended up on the final version of the album. This was their last release with second guitarist Chad Yaro, who left the band in 2001 but would rejoin seven years later.

Release
Reactionary was released in June 2000. The band played shows with Saves the Day, Alkaline Trio, and New Found Glory between late August and early October. In January and February 2001, the band toured the US with H2O and Snapcase. In October 2001, guitarist Chad Yaro had reportedly left the band.

Track listing
All songs by Keith/Shiflett except where noted.
"Disappointed" – 2:48
"Out of Focus" – 3:32
"What's in a Name" – 3:05
"You Could've Had Everything" (Keith) – 2:15
"Hollow" – 3:23
"Think for Yourself" (Keith) – 2:43
"Just Like You Said" – 3:06
"Solitaire" – 3:05
"Best Defense" (Keith, Parada) – 3:47
"Icons" – 3:18
"Shame on Me" – 3:13
"Estranged" (Keith) – 2:52
"Nullification" (Japanese Bonus Track)
"Talk Talk" (Japanese Bonus Track)

Personnel
Trever Keith – guitar, vocals, producer
Chad Yaro – guitar, background vocals
Scott Shiflett – bass guitar, background vocals, producer
Pete Parada – drums

Additional personnel
Chad Blinman – producer, engineer, mixing
Dale Lawton – assistant engineer
Ramon Breton – mastering
Chapman Baehler – photography
Scott Ritcher – design

Charts

References

2000 albums
Face to Face (punk band) albums
Vagrant Records albums